Melanie Griffin is a politician in The Bahamas who was elected as a member of Parliament of the Bahamas for the Yamacraw Constituency, and was Minister of Social Services and Community Development. She was first appointed to the senate in 1999, where she was the only female member of the Progressive Liberal Party. She has represented the Yamacraw constituency in Parliament since 2002.

As Minister of Social Services and Community Development Griffin has enacted four major pieces of legislation – The Residential Care Facilities Act 2004, the Child Protection Act, 2007; the Domestic Violence (Protection Orders) Act, 2007 and the Persons with Disabilities (Equal Opportunities) Bill Act, 2014.

Personal life
Her mother, Telator Strachan, was appointed the Senate by Lynden Pindling in 1987.

References

Living people
Government ministers of the Bahamas
Women government ministers of the Bahamas
21st-century Bahamian women politicians
21st-century Bahamian politicians
Year of birth missing (living people)
People from Nassau, Bahamas
Members of the Senate of the Bahamas
Members of the House of Assembly of the Bahamas
University of the Bahamas alumni
Progressive Liberal Party politicians
Bahamian Christians